Stefan Wannenwetsch (born 19 January 1992) is a German retired footballer who played as a midfielder.

Career
Wannenwetsch made his 2. Bundesliga debut for TSV 1860 Munich in November 2012, in a 2–2 draw with Union Berlin. He signed for FC Ingolstadt 04 in 2014.

On 1 February 2016, Wannenwetsch moved to Hansa Rostock. He made his debut for the club on 6 February 2016 in a 2–0 loss against Stuttgarter Kickers and received a red card on 27 February 2016 in a 1–0 win against Energie Cottbus.

In June 2019 it was announced Wannenwetsch would leave the club after having chosen not to accept Hansa Rostock's offer of a contract extension.

Career statistics

References

External links

1992 births
Living people
Footballers from Baden-Württemberg
German footballers
Association football midfielders
TSV 1860 Munich II players
TSV 1860 Munich players
FC Ingolstadt 04 players
FC Hansa Rostock players
VfR Aalen players
2. Bundesliga players
3. Liga players
FC Ingolstadt 04 II players